Tetsuya Matoyama (born October 1, 1970)  is a Japanese former professional baseball catcher, and current the first squad battery coach for the Fukuoka SoftBank Hawks of Nippon Professional Baseball (NPB).

He previously played for the Osaka Kintetsu Buffaloes, the Orix Buffaloes and the Fukuoka SoftBank Hawks.

Professional career

Active player era
On November 20, 1993, Matoyama was drafted  fourth round pick by the Kintetsu Buffaloes in the  1993 Nippon Professional Baseball draft.

He made his debut in the Pacific League in  appearing in one game. And he played 117 games in the 1999 season, his most ever.

The 2004 Nippon Professional Baseball realignment eliminated the Osaka Kintetsu Buffaloes, and he became a member of the Orix Buffaloes in the distribution draft.

He played three seasons with the Orix Buffaloes before moving to the Fukuoka Softbank Hawks for the 2008 season and retiring that offseason.

Matoyama played in 1026 games during his 15-season career, and recorded batting average .206 with 423 hits, 40 home runs, and 201 RBI.

After retirement
After his retirement,Matoyama has served as the first squad battery coach for the Fukuoka Softbank Hawks since the 2009 season.

Starting with the 2013 season, he moved to the second squad battery coach position, then back to first squad battery coach for the 2015 season, and third squad battery coach for the 2016 season.

In addition, he was in charge of the second squad battery coach from the 2017 season and the third squad battery coach from the 2022 season.

He will serve as the first squad battery coach for the third time during the 2023 season.

References

External links

 Career statistics - NPB.jp 
 85 Tetsuya Matoyama PLAYERS2022 - Fukuoka SoftBank Hawks Official site

1970 births
Living people
People from Himeji, Hyōgo
Japanese baseball players
Nippon Professional Baseball catchers
Kintetsu Buffaloes players
Osaka Kintetsu Buffaloes players
Orix Buffaloes players
Fukuoka SoftBank Hawks players
Japanese baseball coaches
Nippon Professional Baseball coaches